Zimní stadion Břeclav (Břeclav city ice rink) is an arena in Břeclav, Czech Republic. It is primarily used for ice hockey and is the home arena of HC Lvi Břeclav. It is also a perennial host of the Ivan Hlinka Memorial Tournament. Built in 1972, it has a capacity of 4,039.

References

Indoor ice hockey venues in the Czech Republic
Sports venues completed in 1972
1972 establishments in Czechoslovakia
20th-century architecture in the Czech Republic